"When You've Gotta Go" was written by Lynsey de Paul (credited to her birth name, Lynsey Rubin) and Ron Roker. It was recorded by Solomon King at 10cc's Strawberry Studios and produced by Harvey Lisberg and released as a single in 1972. The single was a chart hit in Australia in early 1973, and also spent four weeks on the Dutch "Tipparade", peaking at No. 17. It also appeared on the Polydor compilation album Doppel Pop Tops 3.

Another version of the song was also released as a single in Australia by Jay Justin (a regular on national TV shows Bandstand and the Johnny O'Keefe Show), in November 1973 on the RCA label. Filipino singer Joe Alvarez, also released a version of the song on his 1973 album, Mr. Musicman.

The song was covered by German artist and producer Frank Farian in 1973 as "Was kann schöner sein", with German lyrics by Fred Jay and released as a single as well as a track on his 1973 album, So Muß Liebe Sein. He performed the song on the German TV programme ZDF Hitparade on 17 February, 1973 and it reached No. 48 on the German singles chart on the 16  March that year. His version of the song was featured on the 2009 CD compilation album, Frank Farian – Das beste aus 40 Jahren ZDF Hitparade and is listed as one of Farian's song highlights by "AllMusic". It was also recorded as a track by Jürgen Marcus on his album, Ein Festival Der Liebe. The duo Wyn Hoop & Andrea Horn also recorded "Was kann schöner sein" and released it as a single in Austria and Germany on the Decca Record label.

A Finnish version of the song entitled "Kun Mentävä On" by the artist Danny was released as the B-side to his single "Yksinäinen Ilta", as well as the title track on his 1973 album. A Spanish version of the song with the title "Adios Amigo" (albeit with lyrics partially in English) was also recorded and released as a single by the pop group Los Albas in 1972, as well as a track on their self-titled album in 1974. A French language version with lyrics by J.-C. Deseure entitled "Le Temps De Vivre" was recorded by French group Virus and released as a single in 1973.

In 1974, British vocalist, Ricki Disoni (aka Gordon Waddison, a regularly appearing artist at venues such as The Night Out Theatre Restaurant), released his recording of the song, produced by Dave Richardson (founder of Sky Studios with rock band Jethro Tull), as a track on his UK album, This Is Ricki Disoni.

References

1972 singles
Lynsey de Paul songs
Songs written by Lynsey de Paul
Songs written by Ron Roker